The Sheikhs of Tavil, is a noble Middle Eastern household, which can be traced back to the 7th century. They were given the title “Sheikh”, in this case used when denoting a leader of a community. The prominent male members of the family use the title to this day.

Name
The name of the family comes from the Ottoman Sultans name for the village of Tawella. The Tavil Sheikhs became the ruling sheikhs of their region and to this day carry the right to use the title of Sheikh. They are also called the Siraj-ud-Din family, Siraj-ud-din Sheikhs, or the Sheikhs of Hawraman.

Royal Bloodline (Family Lineage) 
The founder of the family is Uthman Sirâj-ud-Dîn Naqshbandi.

He is Uthman ibn Khâlid ibn Abdullah ibn Sayyid Muhammad ibn Sayyid Darwish ibn Sayyid Mashraf ibn Sayyid Jumu'ah ibn Sayyid Zahir, the son of Al-Hussain ibn Ali ibn Abi Talib.

Hissami Branch 
*Sheikh Uthman Sirâj-ud-Dîn Naqshbandi (1781-1867)
 Sheikh Muhammad Baha-ad-Dín (1836-1881)
 Sheikh Ali Hisam-ad-Din Naqshbandi (1861–1939)
Sheikh Jafar Muhammad Uthman (1863-1927)
Sheikh Sahib Hissami Naqshbandi (1888-1930)
Sheikh Jawad Hissami (1936-2015)
Sheikh Armand Hissami (b.1973)
Rodrigo Armand Hissami (b.1998)

Noble titles 

 Sheikh (In this case, when denoting a leader (Royal). 
 Shah (Sheikh Ali Hisam-ad-Din Naqshbandi, was bestowed the title). 
 Effendi
 Sayyid, Sharif

Social status and political ties 
The sheikhs of Tavil established relationships with the Sultans of the Ottoman Empire. Because of their influence in Kurdistan, they had a vast number of followers. They provided military support for the Ottoman sultans.  An example of this was during the ongoing war between Ottoman-Russia, where the Sheikhs of Tavil has sent thousands of people.

The Sheikhs of Tavil gained recognition through the Ottoman Empire and Qajar Empire  (present day Iran). They supported and promoted moral excellence, planted hundreds of trees, cultivated gardens, and banned the cutting of trees across their lands.

Cecil John Edmonds, with the British intelligence at the time, explains in his book:

Notable family members 
Some of the most prominent family members include:
 Uthman Sirâj-ud-Dîn Naqshbandi
 Sheikh Ali Hisam-ad-Din Naqshbandi
 Muhammed Bahâ-ad-Dîn
Uthman Siraj-ud-Dín Sâni
Sheikh Jawad Hissami

Villages 
The Tavil family established villages:

 Bahakon (Sheikh Ali Hisam-ad-Din Naqshbandi established this village, and it became known for his place of peace. Now the location of his shrine).
 Tebekel  (This lodge is near to Zalam River in Tebekel village).
 Gulp (Established by Muhammed Bahâ-ad-Dîn. After his death, Sheikh Ali Hisam-ad-Din Naqshbandi has expanded it).

Family Tree 
The family tree of the Tavil Sheikhs

References 

Nobility
Naqshbandi order
Political families